Maritha Kaufmann (born 2 January 1981) is a Norwegian retired football midfielder who played for Team Strømmen and the Norwegian national team.

International career
Kaufmann was also part of the Norwegian team at the 2005 European Championships.

References 

1981 births
Living people
Norwegian women's footballers
Norway women's youth international footballers
Norway women's international footballers
Toppserien players
Women's association football defenders
LSK Kvinner FK players